Anteophthalmosuchus (meaning "forward-pointing eye crocodile") is an extinct genus of goniopholidid mesoeucrocodylian from the Early Cretaceous of southern England, eastern Spain, and western Belgium.

Discovery
 
The holotype specimen of Anteophthalmosuchus, from the Wealden Group of the Isle of Wight, includes a well-preserved skull and partial skeleton. This specimen has been known since 1904 and was identified as the "Tie Pits specimen" or the "Hooley specimen" after Reginald Walter Hooley, an amateur paleontologist who had described it in 1905. Hooley had originally attributed the specimen to the previously named species Goniopholis crassidens. Additional referred specimens include a partial disarticulated skeleton and a partial skull that may represent a juvenile specimen.

In 2011, Hooley's specimen was redescribed as a distinct genus and species of goniopholidid called Anteophthalmosuchus hooleyi. The genus name means "forward-pointing eye crocodile" because the specimen's eye sockets are positioned high on the skull and angle forward rather than to the side as in most other flat-skulled crocodyliforms, and the species name honors Hooley. Features that distinguish A. hooleyi from Goniopholis crassidens include the lack of a hole in the lower jaw called the mandibular fenestra, very wide supratemporal fenestrae (openings) on the skull table, and a bone above the eye socket called the palpebral that is small and does not extend over the socket as in some other goniopholidids.

 
Two specimens from Bernissart, Belgium, collectively referred to as "Dollo's goniopholidid", was referred to A. hooleyi in a 2016 redescription. The specimens, which consist of complete skeletons (one missing the skull) from the Sainte-Barbe Clays Formation, were originally referred to Goniopholis simus by Dollo. In 2016, they were recognized as specimens of A. hooleyi due to their distinctive eye sockets, among other defining characteristics of the species. While the Dollo specimens do not possess frontal bones that are pointed at the rostral end, a trait in 2011 to establish A. hooleyi as a distinct species, and also differs in the relative proportions of the occipital condyle and foramen magnum, the authors considered these traits invalid diagnostic characteristics, as they could be a consequence of age differences or preservational artifacts. However, in 2017, Dollo's goniopholidid was moved to a new species, Anteophthalmosuchus epikrator, based on comparisons with newly-discovered specimens from the Isle of Wight.

A second species, Anteophthalmosuchus escuchae, was first described and named by A.D. Buscalioni, L. Alcalá, E. Espílez and L. Mampel in 2013. It is known solely from the holotype AR-1-1097 which consists of a partial skull. It was collected from the early Albian-aged Escucha Formation, at Santa Maria Mine located in the municipality of Ariño, Teruel Province, of Aragon, along with the closely related Hulkepholis plotos.

Description
At an estimated  in length, A. hooleyi would have been the largest crocodyliform in the Wealden faunal assemblage, larger than the contemporaneous species Hylaeochampsa vectiana, Leiokarinosuchus brookensis, and Vectisuchus leptognathus.

Phylogeny
 
Anteophthalmosuchus hooleyi was included in a phylogenetic analysis of goniopholidids that was published soon before the specimen was redescribed. The Hooley and Dollo specimens were found to be the closest relatives of a specimen called "Hulke's goniopholidid", now named  Hulkepholis willetti. Below is a cladogram from that analysis:

References

Early Cretaceous crocodylomorphs of Europe
Fossil taxa described in 2011
Early Cretaceous reptiles of Europe
Prehistoric pseudosuchian genera